The Chicago Innovation Awards was created by the Chicago Sun-Times and Kuczmarski & Associates in 2002. Each year the Awards recognize 10 Chicago area businesses, nonprofits, and government organizations that develop the year's most innovative new products and services.

2014
The 2014 Chicago Innovations Awards reception was held at the Harris Theater. There was a total of 550 nominations by a team of judges. Winners were Auctions By Cellular, Dough, Deuxis, among others.

2013
The 2013 Chicago Innovation Awards reception was held at the Harris Theater. The Collaboration Awards was given to Ingenuity Incorporated for their product, Ingenuity.

Recipients:
 Sagent Pharmaceuticals, Inc. - Heparin with PreventIV Measures
 Rabine Group - PrimeComposite Flooring
 Protein Bar - Protein Bar
 LifeSpine, Inc. - AILERON Expandable Posterior Fusion System
 iLight Technologies, Inc. - SpellBrite
 First Alert - ATOM Smoke & Fire Alarm
 FarmLogix, LLC - Farm To Institutional Kitchen Technology
 Braintree - Venmo Touch
 Belly, Inc. - Belly
 Anova Technologies - RF Connect

2012
The 2012 Chicago Innovation Awards reception was held at the Harris Theater. The People's Choice Award was given to New Futuro for their eponymous product.

Recipients:
 SMS Assist
 PolyBrite International
 OptionsCity
 Medline Industries
 LittelFuse
 Feeding America
 Cummins Allison
 Coyote
 Champion Medical Technologies
 Catamaran
 BrightTag

2011
The 2011 Chicago Innovation Awards reception was held at the Harris Theater.

Recipients:
 World Bicycle Relief - Buffalo Bicycles
 Trustwave - TrustKeeper
 Tripp Lite - SRCOOL12K Portable AC Unit
 Red Frog Events - Active entertainment events
 Navman Wireless - Qtanium 300
 Narrative Science - Authoring Engine
 ITW - Global Capless Refueling System
 Fresh Moves - Mobile produce market
 Elkay - EZH20 Bottle Filling Station
 Callibra - Discharge 1-2-3 Composer
 Appolicious -App for finding apps

2010
The 2010 Chicago Innovation Awards reception was held at the Goodman Theater. A Visionary Award was given to Rocky Wirtz, president of the Wirtz Corp. and owner/chairman of The Chicago Blackhawks, winner  of the Stanley Cup in 2010.

Recipients:
 crowdSPRING - A marketplace for creative services
 Abbott Laboratories - ARCHITECT HIV Ag/Ab Combination Test
 Chicago Transit Authority - Online Bus Tracker system
 Smart Medical Technology - Liftaem patient transfer system
 Master Lock - Speed Dial
 SoCore Energy - Portable solar mounting system
 MJSI Inc. - HydroRight
 USG Corporation - Sheetrock Brand Ultralight Panels
 Lextech Labs - iRa C3
 Molex Inc. - Circular MT Expanded Beam Interconnect
 Touch Taste Technologies - TouchLife Interactive Tables
 InContext Solutions - 3D Virtual Store Research

2009
The 2009 Chicago Innovation Awards reception was held at the Goodman Theater.

Recipients:
 EveryBlock - A news feed for your block
 HeartSounds, Inc. - easy to use cardiac monitoring devices
 Abbott Laboratories - Similac SimplePac
 HERO Pipe - Highrise emergency response offensive pipe
 Aircell - Gogo Inflight Internet Service
 ComScore - comScore Ad Effx Suite: Offline Sales Lift
 Groupon - Collective buying power
 Rescue Vac Systems, Inc. - Rescue Vac 800 Series Rescue Kit
 Suncast Corporation - No Crank Water Powered Hose Reel
 University of Illinois at Chicago - Robotic Surgery Program
 Tripp Lite - ECO Series UPS Systems
 Visible Vote - Vote Past Election Day
 The Art Institute of Chicago - The Modern Wing

2008
The 2008 Chicago Innovation Awards reception was held at the Goodman Theater.

Recipients:
 PrepMe
 Molex
 Flashpoint
 First Alert
 Zorch
 The Gas Technology Institute
 Cleversafe
 Fieldglass Insight
 Abbott Laboratories
 National Pasteurized Eggs

2007
The 2007 Chicago Innovation Awards reception was held at the Goodman Theater. A Visionary Pioneer Award was given to Joe Mansueto, the CEO of Morningstar.

Recipients:
 Abbott Laboratories - The Abbott RealTime HIV-1 Assay and the m2000 System
 Ovation Pharmaceuticals - Innovative Business Model
 Experencia Immersive Learning Center - EarthWorks and Exchange City
 DriFire - driFire Performance FR Wear
 City Of Chicago - Chicago Department of Transportation's Green Alley Program
 S&C Electric Company - TripSaver Dropout Recloser
 SkinnyCorp - Threadless
 Radio Flyer - Ultimate Family Wagon
 SAVO - SAVO
 Fellowes - The Powershred DS1 personal shredder with SafeSense

2006
The 2006 Chicago Innovation Awards reception was held on October 30, 2006 at the Goodman Theater. A Visionary Pioneer Award was given to Gerald Putnam, the founder of Archipelago, an electronic stock exchange that was recently bought out by The New York Stock Exchange. The event was hosted by Thomas Kuczmarski, President and Senior Partner of Kuczmarski & Associates and Dan Miller, Business Editor of the Chicago Sun-Times.

Recipients:
 Sara Lee - Soft and Smooth Made with Whole Grain White Bread
 USG Corporation - SHEETROCK Brand Lightweight All Purpose Joint Compound - Plus 3 (Ready-mixed) with Dust Control
 Feedburner - Feedburner Feed Management
 Motorola - Finger Writing Technology
 Goettsch Partners - 111 S. Wacker Office Building, Chicago
 LoggerHead Tools - Bionic Wrench
 Check, Please! - Check, Please!
 Ocean Tomo LLC - Live Intellectual Property Auctions
 Community Energy Cooperative - Energy-Smart Pricing Plan
 37signals - Basecamp

2005
In 2005, the Chicago Innovation Awards reception was held on October 18 at the Goodman Theater. Casey Cowell, founder of U.S. Robotics was the keynote speaker and the winner of the 2005 Visionary Pioneer Award.

Recipients:
 Abbott Laboratories - PathVysion
 City of Chicago/Millennium Park, Inc. - Millennium Park
 Intellext - Watson
 Laminar Technologies, LLC - TurboTap
 LISC/Chicago - The New Communities Program
 Motorola - RAZR V3
 Novarra - nWeb Mobile Browser
 USG Corporation - DUROCK Tile Membrane
 Vibes Media - iRadio Text Messaging Platform
 Solvent Systems, International - Grease Gator

2004

Recipients:
 ACCO Brands - Wilson Jones Big Mouth Filer
 American Cancer Society - Patient Navigation Services Program
 Arryx - Bioryx Platform
 Chicago Mercantile Exchange and Chicago Board of Trade - Common Clearing Link
 Digital Kitchen - BrandTheatre
 TriTeq Lock and Security - TriTeq Lock
 Orbitz for Business - Orbitz
 Middleby-Marshall Corporation - WOW Pizza Oven
 nPhase, LLC - Machine-to-Machine Solutions

2003

Recipients:
 Abbott Laboratories - HUMIRA
 Archipelago Holdings, LLC - The Archipelago Exchange
 Authentify, Inc. - Authentify
 CoolSavings, Inc. - Coupon Technology
 Globus Alliance - Globus Toolkit
 Motorola - Motorola Canopy Wireless Broadband
 PAWS Chicago - Lurie Family Spay/Neuter Center
 Shure - Sure E2/E2C Earphones
 SmartSignal Corporation - Equipment Condition Monitoring
 Wilson Sporting Goods - Youth Batting Helmet

2002

Recipients:
 Aon Risk Services - Wired for Growth
 Argonne National Laboratory and SourceTech Medical - "Fast Track" Commercialization for Production of 125 Implant Seeds
 City of Chicago - Mayor Daley's Earned Income Tax Credit Program
 Madison Information Technologies - ALIGNDEX
 Northwestern Memorial Hospital - Best Patient Experience
 QuesTek Innovations - Materials by Design
 Rubbermaid Home Products - Tool Tower
 Sara Lee Corporation - Bali Shoulder Spa
 United Airlines - EasyUpdateSM Provided by Centerpost Corporation
 Walgreen Co. - Multi-Language Prescription Label

References

External links
 The Chicago Innovation Awards
 Kuczmarski & Associates Innovation Leadership
 Google Books
 Google Books

Mass media in Chicago
Business and industry awards
Awards established in 2002
2002 establishments in Illinois